The Siberian Zimmerwaldists were a political grouping which emerged in 1915 in Siberia amongst political exiles in Irkutsk. The Siberian Zimmerwaldists got their name from the Zimmerwald Conference, though they existed as a cohesive group prior to that conference, which occurred in September 1915. The exact origins of the name are unclear, though Rex A. Wade suggests it may have been created by Nikolai Sukhanov. They consisted of two principal currents: social democrats—whether Bolshevik, Menshevik, or unaligned—and Internationalist Socialist Revolutionaries grouped around Avram Gots. Irakli Tsereteli, a Georgian Social Democrat exiled in Siberia, took up a leading role within the movement, editing the journal produced by the group and serving as a mentor for several of the members.

At its heart Siberian Zimmerwaldism was based on the ideals of the branch of socialists who were opposed to the war and wanted to restore the Second International, which had fractured upon the outbreak of the war as the various socialist groups differed on policy towards the war: many had abandoned the International in favour of defence of their countries (the so-called "Majority"), while the "Minority" was split between the extreme left (led by Vladimir Lenin), which advocated class warfare, and the more mainstream view that sought to use the International; as such they were known as the "Internationalists", to which the Siberian Zimmerwaldists were related.

Notes

Bibliography

1915 establishments in the Russian Empire
Defunct organizations based in Russia
Organizations established in 1915
Organizations of the Russian Revolution
Organizations with year of disestablishment missing
Socialist organizations in Russia